Criticism of ḥadīth 
is the critique of ḥadīth—the genre of canonized Islamic literature made up of attributed reports of the words, actions, and the silent approval of the Islamic prophet Muhammad.

The legitimacy of ḥadīth is of considerable importance in mainstream Islam because of Quranic injunctions for Muslims to obey Muhammad (in verses such as 24:54, 3:32), and that "he is an excellent example for anyone who has hope in Allah and the last day" (33:21). Mainstream Islam holds that the Sunnah—teachings and doings of Muhammad—are like the Quran, divine revelation to be obeyed, but the "great bulk" of the rules of Sharia (Islamic law) are derived from ḥadīth rather than the Quran. However, some Muslims reject the authority of the hadiths, viewing them as un-Quranic; they believe that obedience to Muhammad means obedience to the Quran; some further claim that most hadiths are fabrications (pseudepigrapha) created in the 8th and 9th century AD, and which are falsely attributed to Muhammad.

Criticism of ḥadīth has taken several forms. The classical Islamic science of ḥadīth studies was developed to weed out fraudulent accounts and establish a "core" of authentic (i.e., "sound" or ṣaḥīḥ) ḥadīth compiled in classical ḥadīth collections. But some Muslim thinkers and schools of Islam contend that these efforts did not go far enough. Among their complaints is that there was a suspiciously large growth in the number of ḥadīth with each early generation; that large numbers of ḥadīth contradicted each other; and that the genre's status as a primary source of Islamic law has motivated the creation of fraudulent ḥadīth.

These critics range from those who accept the techniques of ḥadīth studies but believe a more "rigorous application" is needed (Salafi Jamal al-Din al-Qasimi) in preparation for updating and re-establishing Sharia law; to those who believe it is important to follow the Sunnah but that the only handful of ḥadīth (mutawātir ḥadīth) are of sufficiently reliable basis to accept (19th-century modernist Sayyid Ahmad Khan); to "deniers of hadith" who believe that the ḥadīth are not part of the Sunnah and that what Muslims are required to obey is contained entirely in the Quran (20th-century modernists Aslam Jairajpuri and Ghulam Ahmed Perwez).

Although these scholars and critics have "never attracted a large following", they and others who propose limitations on usage of ḥadīth literature outside of the mainstream include both early Muslims (Al-Nawawi, Wāṣil b. ʿAṭāʾ, Ibrahim an-Nazzam) and later reformers (Syed Ahmed Khan, Muhammad Iqbal). In addition, scholars from the West such as Ignác Goldziher, Joseph Schacht, John Wansbrough, Michael Cook, and Patricia Crone, question its historicity and authenticity.

Importance of hadith and al-Shafiʿi
The earliest schools and scholars of Islamic law—starting around a century and a half after the death of Muhammad—did not all agree on the importance of Prophetic sunnah and its basis, the hadith of Muhammad ("hadith of Muhammad" because in earlier times "hadith" could be used to refer to reports of sayings or doings of other early Muslims). Some (legal pragmatist scholars known as ahl al-raʿy) regarded Prophetic sunnah as only one source of law among many—other sources being the traditions of other caliphs and of leading early Muslims. Others (speculative theologians were known as ahl al-kalām) rejected the authority of hadith because they thought there was no way to be absolutely certain about the authenticity of century and a half old reports of Muhammad's words, actions, and silent approval.

The school credited with establishing the overriding importance of hadith of Muhammad found in classical Islamic law/fiqh was that of al-Shāfiʿī (767–820 CE), founder of the Shafi'i school of fiqh.

Al-Shafi‘i preached that hadiths
"from other persons are of no account in the face of a tradition from the Prophet, whether they confirm or contradict it;
if the other persons had been aware of the tradition from the Prophet, they would have followed it".

A number of scholars, (including Joseph Schacht, Daniel W. Brown) suggest the primacy of hadith of Muhammad in Islamic law/fiqh was not a consensus of opinion among the first generation of Muslims which was then passed down to each succeeding generation. The fact that Shafi'i felt the need to continually insist on his point in his writing suggests (to Joseph Schacht) that he was not upbraiding the occasional deviant/heretic, but that his point had not yet become doctrine/orthodoxy, and he needed to work to establish it there.

Hadith had been passed down by oral transmission until around the third century of Islam and some questioned how closely they followed Muhammad's actual teachings and behavior in authenticity and spirit, but Al-Shafiʿi argued that Muslims must obey the hadith using a "simple proposition: having commanded believers to obey the Prophet, God must certainly have provided the means to do so."

Not only was Sunnah considered divine revelation (wahy) according to Al-Shafi‘i, and records of it (i.e. hadith) the basis of classical Islamic law (Sharia), but the number of verses pertaining to law in the Quran—the other source of divine revelation—are relatively few, while hadith give direction on everything from details of religious obligations (such as Ghusl or Wudu, ablutions for salat prayer), to the correct forms of salutations, and the importance of benevolence to slaves. In the words of J.A.C. Brown, "the full systems of Islamic theology and law are not derived primarily from the Quran. Muhammad's sunna was a second but far more detailed living scripture, and later Muslim scholars would thus often refer to the Prophet as `The Possessor of Two Revelations`".

Al-Shafiʿi's success  was such that later writers "hardly ever thought of sunna as comprising anything but that of the Prophet", but later critics of hadith sometimes made similar arguments to that of the early schools that competed with Al-Shafiʿi's theory (such as the belief that only the Quran was divine revelation).

Science of hadith

"Criticism" of hadith in the sense of weeding out fraudulent accounts and establishing a core of authentic "sound" (sahih) hadiths—was taken on by the classical Islamic science of hadith (ʻilm al-ḥadīth, also "hadith studies").  This science became a "mature system", or  entered its "final stage" with the compilation of the classical collections of hadith  in the third century of Islam, roughly a century after al-Shafiʿi's passing. 

The establishment of this elaborate system of evaluating the authenticity of traditions science/discipline was important in Islam for a number of reasons: After the third century of Islam the triumph of Al-Shafiʿi's doctrine meant that the supreme importance of the Sunnah of the Prophet was undisputed.  The status of Hadith 
as primary sources of Islamic law gave them great power as "ideological" tools in political/theological conflicts.  But since hadith were transmitted orally over 100–150 years, until the classic collections of hadith of third century of Islam were compiled, there was no written documentation to verify the chain of transmission of a hadith.

Forgery "took place on a massive scale" which threatened to undermine hadith's divine legitimacy of reports of the Prophet. An idea of how massive the scale was can be gleaned from the fact that Muhammad al-Bukhari, perhaps the most famous collector of hadith, reportedly examined nearly 600,000 narrations, and eliminated all but approximately 7400 (this includes different versions of the same report and repetitions of the same report with different isnad, i.e. chains of transmitters).

The system of judging the authenticity (sihha) of hadith is based on three criteria in hadith studies:  
Whether a report was corroborated with "other identical reports from other transmitters"; such mutawatir hadith were reliable but very rare. For all the other numerous hadith that did not meet this criteria, evaluate ...
the "reliability in character and capacity" of the transmitters of reports with only one chain (isnad) of transmitters,
(this did not apply to the companions of prophet (ṣaḥāba) transmitting in the chain because their character and competence was guaranteed "by virtue of their direct association" with Muhammad);
"the continuity of their chains of transmission".
These criteria in turn are based on other premises:
That "defects of corruption in hadith could be directly attributed to lack of character (ʿadāla) or competence (ḍābiṯ) in its transmitters";
that these "faulty transmitters could be identified";
and that while the transmitters should be evaluated, there was no need to question the concept of chains/isnads of the hadith as accounts "of the actual transmission history of a tradition."

Evaluation was "almost exclusively" of the chain/isnad of the hadith, and not the content (matn).

The work of ʻilm al-ḥadīth criticism of hadith is found in major collections of hadith of the third century of Islam—which for Sunni Muslims is Kutub al-Sittah. (Kutub al-Sittah, or "The six books", includes Sahih al-Bukhari  of Muhammad al-Bukhari, mentioned above, but also Sahih Muslim, Sunan Abu Dawood, Jami' al-Tirmidhi, Sunan Al-Nasa'i, and Sunan ibn Majah.)

History of Muslim criticism of hadith
Critics of collection and/or use of hadith in Islam are found in the early era when the classical consensus of al-Shafiʿi was being developed and established (particularly by the ahl-i-kalam and Muʿtazila) and many centuries later in the modern era when Islamic reformists (such as the ahl-i-Quran and thinkers such as Syed Ahmed Khan, Muhammad Iqbal) sought to revitalize Islam.  In addition scholars from the West such as Ignác Goldziher and Joseph Schacht have criticized the science of hadith starting in the 19th century.

Early criticism
Science of hadith
"Systematic application of hadith criticism" began with Abū Hanīfa (died 767 CE/150 AH) when there were a "huge number of forged hadith" creating a situation "out of control". But hadith studies criticism of hadith did not begin with him as "his "intellectual forebears" and contemporary Islamic scholars Mālik (d.179 AH) and Al-Shafi‘i (d.204 AH) were also "severe critics of hadith".
Perhaps the most famous of the classical collections of ṣaḥīḥ hadith in Sunni Islam, Ṣaḥīḥ al-Bukhārī, was completed around 846 CE/232 AH.
ʻIlm al-ḥadīth, or "hadith studies", became a "mature system", or entered its "final stage" with the compilation of the classical collections of hadith  in the third century of Islam, roughly a century after al-Shafiʿi's passing. (The last of the authors of the Kutub al-Sittah or "Authentic Six" books of ṣaḥīḥ hadith to die was al-Nasa'i (d. 915 CE/303 AH).

Ahl al-Kalam
According to scholar Daniel W. Brown, the questioning of the authenticity, scholarship and importance of Hadith goes back to the second century of Islam when al-Shafiʿi was establishing the final authority of a hadith of Muhammad in Islamic law. An opposing group, known as Ahl al-Kalam, were "highly critical of both the traditionists' method and the results of their work",
doubting "the reliability of the transmission" of the hadith,  including the traditionists' evaluation of the "qualities of the transmitters" of hadith they considered "purely arbitrary",
and thought the collections of hadiths to be "filled with contradictory, blasphemous, and absurd traditions."

They did not doubt that Muslims ought to follow the example of the prophet, but maintained his "true legacy" was found "first and foremost in following the Quran"—an "explanation of all things"—which hadith "should never be allowed to rule on". If a question was "not referred to in the Qur'an", Ahl al-Kalam "tended" to regard it as "having been left deliberately unregulated by God."  They contended that obedience to the Prophet was contained in obeying only the Qur'an that God has sent down to him, and that when the Qur'an mentioned "the Book" together with "Wisdom", "Wisdom" was not another word for hadith, but for "the specific rulings of the Book".

Mutazilites
Later, a similar group, the Mu'tazilites (which flourished in Basra and Baghdad in the 8th–10th centuries CE), also viewed the transmission of the Prophetic sunnah as not sufficiently reliable. The Hadith, according to them, was mere guesswork and conjecture, while the Quran was complete and perfect, and did not require the Hadith or any other book to supplement or complement it."

According to Racha El Omari, early Mutazilites believed that hadith were susceptible to "abuse as a polemical ideological tool"; that the matn (content) of the hadith—not just the isnad—ought to be scrutinized for doctrine and clarity; that for hadith to be valid they ought to be "supported by some form of tawātur", i.e. by a large number of isnād strands, each beginning with a different companion.

In writing about mutawatir (hadith transmitted via numerous chains of narrators) and ahad  (hadith with a single chain, i.e. almost all hadith) and their importance from the legal theoretician's point of view, Wael Hallaq notes the medieval scholar Al-Nawawi (1233–1277 CE) argued that any non-mutawatir hadith is only probable and can not reach the level of certainty that a mutawatir hadith can. However scholars like Ibn al-Salah (d. 1245 CE), al-Ansari (d. 1707 CE), and Ibn ‘Abd al-Shakur (d. 1810 CE) found "no more than eight or nine" hadiths that fell into the mutawatir category.

Wāṣil b. ʿAṭāʾ  (700–748 CE, by many accounts a founder of the Mutazilite school of thought), held that there was evidence for the veracity of a report when it had four independent transmitters. His assumption was that there could be no agreement between all transmitters in fabricating a report. Wāṣil's acceptance of tawātur seems to have been inspired by the juridical notion of witnesses as proof that an event did indeed take place. Hence, the existence of a certain number of witnesses precluded the possibility that they were able to agree on a lie, as opposed to the single report which was witnessed by one person only, its very name meaning the "report of one individual" (khabar al-wāḥid). Abū l-Hudhayl al-ʿAllāf (d. 227/841) continued this verification of reports through tawātur, but proposed that the number of witnesses required for veracity be twenty, with the additional requirement that at least one of the transmitters be a believer.

One Mu'tazilite who expressed the strongest statement of skepticism of any source of knowledge outside of reason and the Qurʾān was Ibrahim an-Nazzam  (c. 775 – c. 845). For him, both the single and the mutawātir reports could not be trusted to yield knowledge. He recounted contradictory ḥadīth and examined their divergent content (matn) to show why they should be rejected: they relied on both faulty human memory and bias, neither of which could be trusted to transmit what is true. Al-Naẓẓām bolstered his strong refutation of the trustworthiness of ḥadīth within the larger claim that ḥadīth circulated and thrived to support polemical causes of various theological sects and jurists, and that no single transmitter could by himself be held above suspicion of altering the content of a single report. Al-Naẓẓām's skepticism involved far more than excluding the possible verification of a report, be it single or mutawātir. His stance also excluded the trustworthiness of consensus, which proved pivotal to classical Muʿtazilite criteria devised for verifying the single report (see below). Indeed, his shunning of both consensus and tawātur earned him a special mention for the depth and extent of his skepticism, even among fellow Muʿtazilites.

Modern era
According to Daniel Brown, "three topics that dominated Muslim discussions of the authenticity of hadith" in the work of 19th century Islamic scholar Syed Ahmed Khan and after him were 
the ʿadāla of the Companions of the Prophet (i.e. their  character and competence as transmitters of hadith) and how it was guaranteed "by virtue of their direct association" with Muhammad according to traditional hadith science, yet not borne out by further investigation);
the manner in which hadith were preserved and transmitted (and whether this made collected hadith reliable enough to prevent corruption):
the efficacy of isnad criticism in  distinguishing authentic and spurious traditions.
Both conservative revivalists and liberal modernists of 20th century believed  "the Sunnah should be reevaluated in the light of the Quran", contrary to Al-Shafiʽi and classical hadith criticism.

Revivalism

Critics of hadith very different from the rationalists were revivalists like Shah Waliullah Dehlawi, Shibli Nomani, Rashid Rida, Salafi Jamal al-Din al-Qasimi,
Abul A'la Maududi, and Mohammed al-Ghazali. 
They believe strongly in the authority of The Prophet, the following the principles of classical hadith criticism, and the necessity of sharia law the shamefulness of the "deniers of hadith"; but they also believed that the classical collections of hadith needed to be re-examined to eliminate corrupted traditions  (despite the fact that they supposedly were the product of classical hadith criticism), that evaluation of hadith matn/content had been neglected by classical scholars and that legal scholars should be used to remedy the situation, and that the results should be used to reformulate sharia law.

In the 18th century,  Shah Waliullah Dehlawi (1703–1762) sought to reverse the decline of Muslim power in India as the Mughal empire began to collapse. To restore Muslim dominance he preached jihad but he was also interested in a religious revival against innovation (bidah) and against unthinking obedience to classical law (taqlid), where original sources were unexamined and ijtihad unpracticed. A "revival of the study of hadith was at the heart of his program." He sought to examine hadith content (matn) which Hadith experts had traditionally ignored, to clear up apparent contradictions among the hadith caused by transmitters who did not always understand "the significance" of what they had witnessed by using scholars with expertise in both hadith studies and jurisprudence.

Later in the 20th century, Salafist revivalists Shibli Nomani, Rashid Rida, Abul A'la Maududi, and Mohammed al-Ghazali  also sought "to restore Islam to ascendency" (not just in India) and in particular to restore Sharia to the law of the lands of Islam it had been before being replaced by "secular, Western inspired law codes" of colonialism and modernity.  At the same time they agreed that restoring relevant Sharia required "some reformulation" of the law, which would require a return to sources, which required agreement on how the sources were to be "interpreted and understand" and reassessment of hadith.

Shibli Nomani (1857–1914) argued that the traditional science of Hadith had errored by ignoring legal scholarship when its work  "required the participation of legal scholars" (fuqaha).  Instead had been dominated by Hadith collectors (muhaddith).

Applying legal scholarship involved examining hadith content (matn) for its spirit and relevance "within the context of the Sharia as a whole" according to the method of scholars of Islamic law (fuqaha) and weeding out corrupted hadith  inconsistent with "reason, with human nature, and with historical conditions".  (Rather than hadith collectors being the scholars of hadith science, they more resembled "laborers" who provided the raw materials to the "engineers" of hadith—namely the scholars of Islamic law.)  Abul A'la Maududi (1903–1979), the leading South Asian revivalist of the 20th century, also argued matn was neglected and resulting in Hadith collectors accepting "traditions that ring false" and rejecting "traditions that ring true".

Maududi also raised the question of the reliability of companions of the prophet as transmitters of hadith, saying "even the noble companions were overcome by human weaknesses, one attacking another", and cited disputes among the companions: 
Ibn Umar called Abu Hurayra a liar; Aisha criticized Anas for transmitting traditions although he was only a child during the life of the Prophet, and Hasan b. Ali called both Ibn Umar and Ibn al-Zubayr liars.  (Maududi's criticism clashed with the doctrine of classical hadith criticism that the collective moral character (ʿadāla) of the first generation of Muslims was above reproach, and though Maududi strongly opposed modernists who thought hadith should be used sparingly or not at all in Islamic law, he nonetheless came under attack from traditional Islamic scholars (ulama) for his views).

Yusuf al-Qaradawi (born 1926) offered "three basic principles of hadith criticism" to work with sunnah:
verification of the "trustworthiness and authenticity" of the hadith using "the tools of classical isnād criticism";
examination of the circumstances of the "event or utterance" of the hadith, the "reasons for its occurrence", "its place among" Quranic verses and other hadith, must be done in order to understand the hadith's "real meaning and intent";
comparison of hadith with "other more reliable texts" to ensure it does not contradict them.

Preeminence of the Quran
A theme that separated both conservative revivalists and liberal modernists of the 20th century from Al-Shafiʽi and classical hadith criticism was whether the "Sunna rules on the Quran" (as Al-Shafiʽi believed), or whether "the Sunnah should be reevaluated in the light of the Quran" (a belief that became the prevalent in the modern era).

Later in the 20th century another revivalist Mohammed al-Ghazali (1917–1996), also urged re-examination of "isolated" Hadith urging that they be subordinate to "higher principles of authority". These included mutawatir traditions, the practice of the community, and "most important, the Quran". While Shafīʿī and classical scholarship held that the "Sunnah rules on the Quran", Al Ghazali (and Shibli, Rashid Rida, Maududi) believed that the Quran must be "the supreme arbiter of the authenticity" of hadith. Rida "argued that all traditions  at variance with the Quran should be discarded, irrespective of their chain of transmission". Examples of conflicts between the two sources were 
whether consumption of beef was haram, (The Quran gave permission to eat it, but muhaddith Muhammad Nasiruddin al-Albani declared it forbidden citing a hadith.) 
Whether the murder of a non-Muslim should be punished just as the murder of a Muslim was—with qiṣāṣ, or retribution. (When a non-Muslim engineer was attacked and killed in Saudi Arabia, a religious judge—qadi—ruled that qiṣāṣ could not be applied to his murderer, citing a hadith stating la yuqtalu muslimun fi kafirin. According to Muhammad al-Ghazali, this violated a Quranic principle of human dignity, though others do not find it in disagreement with the Quran.)

Modernists
Later, in nineteenth century British Raj, Islamic modernists like Syed Ahmed Khan sought to deal with Western colonial influence and the decline of Muslim powers through greater understanding of science  and application of reason. They often favored reinterpretation of some doctrines, including sharia law in favor of modern norms like equal rights, peaceful coexistence, and freedom of thought.

Ahmed Khan "questioned the historicity and authenticity of many, if not most, traditions, much as the noted scholars Ignaz Goldziher and Joseph Schacht would later do." 
He blamed corruption of hadith on  transmission according to  bi'l-ma'na (sense of the story rather than verbatim) in particular,  and "came to believe" only mutawatir hadith as "a reliable basis for belief independent of the Quran".  Ahmed Khan was one of the pioneers of "the argument that the traditional hadith scientists (muḥaddithūn) neglected criticism of the matn (hadith content)—emersed in the difficulties of "examining the trustworthiness" of the narrators of the hadith, "they never got around" to the task of examining the hadith content.

Ahmed Khan's student, Chiragh Ali, went further, suggesting nearly all the Hadith were fabrications. Although Muhammad Iqbal never rejected the hadith wholesale, he proposed limitations on its usage by arguing that it should be taken contextually and circumstantially. Ghulam Ahmed Pervez, a disciple of Iqbal, also asks why, if hadith were divine revelation (wahy), were they "neither written down, nor memorized, nor systematically collected or preserved", as Muhammad and/or his immediate followers made sure the Quran was.

Muhammad Tawfiq Sidqi (d. 1920) of Egypt "held that nothing of the Hadith was recorded until after enough time had elapsed to allow the infiltration of numerous absurd or corrupt traditions."

According to Jonathan A.C. Brown, "by far the most influential Modernist critique" of Sunni hadith tradition came from a disciple of Egyptian Rashid Rida named Mahmoud Abu Rayya. In Lights on the Muhammadan Sunna (Adwa` `ala al-Sunna al-Muhammadiyya), Abu Rayya argued that the basis of Islam was intended to be only "the Quran, reason and unquestionably reliable mutawatir accounts of the Prophet's legacy". Pointing out that non-mutawatir hadith allowed unreliable transmitters such as Abu Hurairah (mentioned above) to contaminate sahih hadith collections. Like Ahmad Khan he blamed corruption of hadith on transmission according to  the meaning/sense of the story rather than its exact wording.

Like some other revivalists, Modernists emphasized pre-eminence of the Quran. Sayyid Ahmad Khan's concern for corruption of hadith led him to "regard the Quran as the supreme standard against which other information about the Prophet should be tested.  Rashid Rida argued all hadith "at variance" with the Quran "should be discarded, irrespective of their chain of transmission."  Following him, "numerous Egyptian intellectuals", such as Taha Hussein and Mohammed Hussein Heikal, also argued that the Quran "overruled" hadith.

Complete rejection of hadith as a basis for Islamic law

Espousals of the pre-eminence of the Quran, by at least one modernist, resembled the thought of the Ahl al-Kalam mentioned above.

Muhammad Tawfiq Sidqi wrote an article titled 'al-Islam huwa ul-Qur'an Wahdahu' ('Islam is the Qur'an Alone) that appeared in the Egyptian journal al-Manar, which argues that the Quran is sufficient as guidance: "what is obligatory for man does not go beyond God's Book. ... If anything other than the Qur'an had been necessary for religion," Sidqi notes, "the Prophet would have commanded its registration in writing, and God would have guaranteed its preservation." (He was opposed by Rashid Rida and later recanted.)

Textual Criticism
Whether al-Bukhari and other traditional hadith scholars were successful in narrowing down hadith to its authentic "core" is disputed.  Medieval Jurist and hadith scholar Al-Nawawi wrote that "a number of scholars discovered many hadiths" in the two most authentic hadith collections—Sahih al-Bukhari and Sahih Muslim—"which do not fulfill the conditions of verification assumed" by the collectors of those works; and European scholar (Joseph Schacht), argues that "even the classical corpus contains a great many traditions which cannot possibly be authentic".

Al-Ghazali addresses questions from an unnamed "questioner" about a number of problems the questioner sees in several hadith  in his work Al-Qanun al-kulli fi t-ta'wil;  such as: "Satan runs in the blood vessels of one of you" "satans nourish themselves from manure and bones", and "Paradise is as wide as heaven and earth", yet it must be contained somewhere within the bounds of those two?"

Centuries earlier, objections by Mutazila to these and similar hadith and been dismissed by Sunni scholars as error brought about by a failure  to subordinate reason to divine scripture. When fifteenth century medieval scholar Ibn Hajar al-Asqalani came across the hadith
When `God created Adam, and he was sixty arms tall,' and that, after Adam fell, 'mankind has continued to shrink since that time.'
he noted that the ancient inhabitants of houses carved out of cliffs he had seen must have been about the same size humans of his day, simply "admitted frankly that 'to this day, I have not found how to resolve this problem, without doubting the hadith's authenticity.
However, with the rise of natural sciences and technology of the West, some Muslims came to a different conclusion.

Critics complain of hadith that sound less like what a prophet would say than someone in the post-Shafiʿi era justifying fabricating hadith. Such as
 '[Sayings attributed to me] which agree with the Koran, go back to me, whether I actually said them or not', and 
 'Whatever good sayings there are, I said them.'

Joseph Schacht argues that the very large number of contradictory hadith are very likely the result of hadith fabricated "polemically with a view to rebutting a contrary doctrine or practice" supported by another hadith.

Hadith that appear to contradict each other
Some examples of hadith members of the Muʿtazila found fault with include:
"Whoever has a mustard seed's weight of pride (arrogance) in his heart, shall not be admitted into Paradise. And whoever has a mustard seed's weight of faith in his heart, shall not be admitted into the Fire." 
There is none among the bondsmen who affirmed his faith in La illaha ill-Allah there is no God but Allah) and died in this state and did not enter Paradise ... even though he committed adultery and theft.
The two hadith suggest God considers adultery and theft less serious than a grain of pride.

Hadith contradict each other over whether the Islamic prophet urinated while standing:
According to Hudhaifa:
I saw Allah's Messenger coming to the dumps of some people and urinated there while standing.
According to Umar:
"The Messenger of Allah saw me urinating while standing, and he said: 'O 'Umar, do not urinate standing up.' So I never urinated whilst standing after that."

Hadith appearing to be in conflict with science

Islamic scholar Jonathan A. C. Brown describes hadith that were particularly troubling (sometimes called mushkil al-ḥadīth) for some pious educated Muslims of the 19th and 20th centuries.

Another hadith from Sahih al-Bukhari seemed in conflict with astronomical knowledge:
 
"... the Prophet said, "O Abu Dharr! Do you know where the sun sets?" .... It goes and prostrates underneath (Allah's) throne; And that is Allah's Statement ..."  J.A.C. Brown writes: 
How does the sun, an orb, prostrate itself? It has no knees or joints. Like Aristotle and Augustine, Muslim scholars knew the earth was a sphere. In the course of one of their basic duties—calculating prayer times in various locales—they had noticed that the sun is always visible somewhere, rising and setting at different times depending on latitude and longitude. When would it be free to engage in this prostration before the throne of God?
Others in Sahih al-Bukhari are 
"when the Devil hears the call to prayer, 'he flees, farting. 
This provoked another Egyptian and friend of Sidqi, Mahmud Abu Rayya, to also question hadith.

Arguments and explanations for existence of false hadith 

Among the scholars who believe that even sahih hadith suffer from corruption or who proposed limitations on usage of hadith include early Muslims Al-Nazzam (775845 CE), Ibn Sa'd (784845 CE), Al-Nawawi (12331277 CE), Ibn Hajar (13721449 CE), later reformers Syed Ahmed Khan (18171898 CE), Muhammad Iqbal (18771938 CE); and scholars from the West such as Ignác Goldziher, Joseph Schacht, and G.H.A. Juynboll, (and in the present day Israr Ahmed Khan).

Flaws in traditional hadith science
For many critics, the contradictions of hadith with natural law and with other hadith demonstrated that the traditional scientists of hadith (muhaddithin) had failed to find all false hadith and there must be something wrong with their method. 
Explanations of why this was included the neglect of hadith content (matn) by muhaddithin in favor of the evaluation of chain/isnad of the hadith.  But this did not mean critics accepted the traditional evaluation of hadith transmission  with its supposed knowledge of the character and capacity of the reported narrators, that the scientists had focused on. How could the study of the character of transmitters (ʿilm al-rijāl) be an exact science when it was "difficult enough to judge the character of living people, let alone those long dead." Information on the narrators was scarce and often conflicting, hypocrites could be very clever, there was "no assurance that all the relevant information" had been gathered, and if hadith could be falsified, could not the historical reports about transmitters be as well?

And for that matter, if the content (matn) of a hadith could be forged, why could not the chain of transmitters—the isnad? This was an issue traditional scientists of hadith had "completely discounted" and was "perhaps the most serious challenge of all" to classical hadith criticism (according to Daniel Brown). How could a hadith be judged "reliable on the basis of its chain of transmission when we know that forgers commonly fabricated" these chains "in order to hide their forgery?" There was, after all, strong incentive "to attribute one's own information" to the most highly regarded authorities.

Motivations/explanations for corruption 
According to Bernard Lewis, "in the early Islamic centuries there could be no better way of promoting a cause, an opinion, or a faction than to cite an appropriate action or utterance of the Prophet." This gave strong incentive to fabricate hadith.

According to Daniel W. Brown citing Syed Ahmed Khan  and Shibli Nomani, the major causes of corruption of even the ṣaḥīḥ hadith of Bukhari and Muslim are: 
political conflicts, 
sectarian prejudice, and 
the desire to translate the underlying meaning (bi'l-maʿnā), rather than the original words verbatim (bi'l-lafẓ).

Other criticism
whatever the motive was to falsify, and in addition to the indisputable contradictions in hadith, there are reasons why some sahih hadith must be wrong or should not given an exalted position as source of Islamic law: 
With the exception of the ḥadīth qudsī, sunnah/hadith was not revealed and transmitted verbatim (bi'l-lafẓ), as was the Quran. It was often transmitted giving the sense or gist of what was said (known as bi'l-maʿnā);
Unlike the Quran, sunnah/hadith was not "preserved in writing" until over a century after Muhammad's death. This opens the question of how much corruption and/or error entered the writings, and why—if sunnah/hadith was divinely revealed, eternal truth—orders were not given to the earliest Muslims to write it down as they were for the Quran. If Muhammad did forbid the writing of hadith, does not that suggest it was not "intended to be taken as binding" on later Muslims.
Islamic law/Shariah involves the honor, property and lives of Muslims, and so its sources should be held to the highest standards, providing a "certainty of knowledge". The sahih hadith that are the primary source of Islamic law/Shariah are defined as "authentic"—rated above hasan (good) and daif (weak) hadith. But they do not provide "certainty of knowledge" that Mutawatir hadith (meaning reports from "a large number of narrators whose agreement upon a lie is inconceivable") do. (Unfortunately, the extreme scarcity of Mutawatir hadith limits their use in development of Islamic law.)

Other arguments that the sunnah in the form of the hadith falls short of the standard of the Quran in divinity include:

Unreliable transmitters
The primary tool of orthodox ʻilm al-ḥadīth (Hadith studies) to verify the authenticity of hadith is the hadith's isnad (chain) of transmitters. But in the oldest collections of hadith (which have had less opportunity to be corrupted by faulty memory or manipulation) isnad are "rudimentary", while the isnads found in later "classical" collections of hadith are usually "perfect", suggesting the correlation between supposedly high quality isnads and authentic hadith is not good.

According to Muslim Islamic scholar Jonathan A.C. Brown, 20th century Egyptian scholar Mahmoud Abu Rayya noted the problem of transmission of hadith from allegedly reliable companions of the Prophet.  One Abu Hurairah, joined the Muslim community only three years before the Prophet's death (i.e. when the community was becoming triumphant) yet was the "single most prolific" transmitter of hadiths from among the companions, passing on "thousands of hadiths he claimed" to have heard—far more traditions than companions who had been with Muhammad since the beginning. Abu Rayya and others think it highly unlikely Abu Hurairah could have heard the thousands of hadiths he claimed to transmitted, nor that he learned the details of ritual and law to avoid mangling the meanings of hadiths on these issues he reported. (Abu Hurayra was also known to be obsessed with isr’iliyyat, i.e. tales from Jewish lore about earlier prophets, see below).

According to some narrations, Caliph ʿUmar discouraged the systematic documentation of Prophetic sayings. However, he would also send letters documenting rulings provided by the Prophet Muhammad. During the Umayyad dynasty, hadith forgeries that attacked their enemy Ali and supported dynasty founder Muʿāwiya were state sponsored. The succeeding dynasty—the ʿAbbāsids—circulated hadith predicting "the reign of each successive ruler". Even traditionists whose job it was to filter out false hadith, cirulated fabricated hadith for causes they thought worthy—one Nūḥ b. Maryam "passed on false traditions [hadith] in praise of the Quran".

Influence of other religions
In hadith studies, narratives assumed to be of foreign import are known as Israʼiliyyat. Although the designation indicates such stories develop from Jewish/Israelite sources, they may derive from other religions such as Christianity or Zoroastrianism.  Some pre-modern scholars enthusiastically used them in exegisis while others condemned their use. In modern times they have been criticized as unIslamic.

Mahmud Abu Rayya (d. 1970), a friend and fellow disciple of Rashid Rida, argued in a 1958 book entitled "Lights on Muhammad's Sunna" (Adwa' 'al al-sunna al-muhammadiyya) that "many supposedly authentic Hadiths were actually Jewish lore that had been attributed to Muhammad".

The earliest Western scholar to note a relation between the hadith and Jewish influences was the French Orientalist Barthélemy d'Herbelot (d. 1695), who "claimed that most of the six books" (i.e. the "Kutub al-Sittah", the six collections of Sunni sahih/sound hadith) "and many parts of the hadith literature were appropriated from the Talmud" (the Talmud being recorded in Jerusalem at least a century before the birth of Muhammad—between the 2nd and 5th centuries CE—and later in what is now Iraq). Later many others orientalists, like Aloys Sprenger (d. 1893), Ignaz Goldziher (d. 1921), etc. continued criticism in that direction.

A more elaborated study was "Al‐Bukhārī and the Aggadah" by W.R. Taylor. Taylor compared some hadiths from Sahih al-Bukhari with "haggadic texts from the Talmud and Midrash", and concluded that the "hadiths were appropriated from the Talmud and Midrash".  Taylor argued that large amounts of Jewish "oral information, narrations, stories, and folkloric information" found its way into "Islamic literature in general, and hadith literature in particular, during the transcription of the Talmud and Mishnah and after the formation of hadiths via the Jews living in the Arabian Peninsula, as well as the church fathers and Christian community." Other scholars find different religious influences for hadith: Franz Buhl connects the hadith with a more Iranian/Zoroastrian background, David Samuel Margoliouth with Biblical apocrypha and Alfred Guillaume puts more stress on a generic Christian influence.

Orthodox response

Against critics claims that oral transmission of hadith for generations  allowed corruption to occur, conservatives argue that it is not oral transmission that is unreliable but written transmission. In fact oral transmission was "superior to isolated written documents" which had "little value" unless "attested by living witnesses". In contrast, the reliability of oral transmission was "assured by the remarkable memories of the Arabs".

Orthodox Muslims do not deny the existence of false hadith, but believe that through the work of hadith scholars, these false hadith have been largely eliminated. al-Shafi'i himself, the founder of the proposition that "sunna" should be made up exclusively of specific precedents set by Muhammad passed down as hadith, argued that "having commanded believers to obey the Prophet", (in Quranic verse Al-Ahzab 33: 21: "In God's messenger you have indeed a good example for everyone who looks forward with hope to God and the Last Day, and remembers God unceasingly.") "God must certainly have provided the means to do so." Hadith were evaluated for forgeries from the beginning, before the science of hadith was established. The number of false hadith is exaggerated. Many hadith not in sahih collections are perfectly authentic. And the science of hadith reached such a level of perfection that "no further research is necessary or fruitful". Furthermore, critics who cite hadith that criticize the use of hadith are "tacitly accepting its authority as a legitimate basis for argument" and so contradicting themselves.

One defense of orthodox hadith studies, The Evolution of a Hadith by  Iftikhar Zaman, according to one supporter (Bilal Ali) asserts that "the method of hadith criticism that has been implemented by the muhaddithin [orthodox hadith evaluators] for the past thousand years, ... is far more scientific and exact than modern orientalist approaches." Traditional Islamic scholars who have endeavored to refute the Western criticism of hadith include Mustafa al-Siba'i and Muhammad Mustafa Al-A'zami.

Some Western academics have also been critical of this "revisionist" approach as a whole, for instance Harald Motzki, (who according to Jonathan Brown demonstrates "convincingly" that studies of early hadith and law by Joseph Schacht and the late G. H. A. Juynboll "used only a small and selective body of sources", "based on sceptical assumptions which, taken together, often asked the reader to believe a set of coincidences far more unlikely than the possibility that a hadith might actually date from the genesis of the Islamic community.")
	
One prominent conservative fatwa website, The Salafi site IslamQA, supervised by Muhammad Saalih al-Munajjid, states that one who "persists in denying and rejecting" a hadith is exposing themselves to "grave danger" unless they

find a "complete contradiction" that is "clear and unambiguous in meaning and not abrogated" between substance of the hadith they reject and what is mentioned in a Qur’anic text,
see "a weakness in one of the links of the isnad" in the hadith "that could have led to the mistake mentioned in the text",
and state that their rejection of the hadith is "a personal view ... which may be right or wrong".

Interpreting injunctions to obey/imitate the Prophet
Those who argue that even sahih hadith cannot be considered reliably authentic confront the orthodox doctrine of al-Shafiʿi—i.e. that verses of the Quran order Muslims to obey the Prophet and follow his sunnah, and that the Sunnah is spelled out in the collections of sahih hadith. Some of the critics embrace hadith that are much more rare but more certain than sahih, known as mutawatir hadith; others reject hadith completely, arguing the command to obey the Sunnah of the prophet only applied to the first generation of Muslims, and/or that commands to obey the Prophet applying to all Muslims refer only to obedience to the Quran.

Use of limited set of mutawatir hadith 
According to M.O. Farooq, while it is untrue that sahih hadith  provides "certainty of knowledge" of what Muhammad said, there is a  subset of sahih that can be provide this knowledge—the much rarer mutawātir hadith. Mutawātir involves something transmitted by "a large number of narrators whose agreement upon a lie is inconceivable. This condition must be met in the entire chain from the origin of the report to the very end." (Mutawātir sunnah includes ṣalāt prayer and the ceremonies of hajj pilgrimage;  the "entire Quran itself is accepted as" being mutawātir; in addition there are a small number of mutawātir hadith)

However, while mutawatir hadith would exclude the implausible and contradictory hadith outlined above, and might satisfy the Quranic injunctions to obey and imitate Muhammad, they would not provide a basis for the Islamic jurisprudence developed and revered by Muslims for centuries. (Scholars differ on how many mutawatir hadith there are, but the number of  mutawātir bil lafz hadith, (mutawatir that involve narrations in identical wording rather than wording with the same meaning) is thought to be only a dozen or less.)  According to Wael Hallaq, "the bulk of hadith with which the traditionists dealt, and on the basis of which the Jurists derived the law" were known as ahad—i.e. non-mutawatir hadith; Hadith without "textually identical channels of transmission which are sufficiently numerous as to preclude any possibility of collaboration on a forgery". The authenticity of these hadith "are known only with probability", not certainty.

Jurists disagreed on how many channels of transmission there had to be for a hadith to be mutawatir. Since "the qadi in a court of law must deliberate on the testimony of four witnesses (as well as investigate their moral rectitude) before he renders his verdict," some thought at least five, but others set the number at "12, 20, 40, 70 or 313, each number being justified by a Qur'anic verse or some religious
account".

Farooq quotes a number of sources speaking highly of Mutawatir:
In the view of Muslim scholars any hadith which has been transmitted by tawatur and whose reporters based their reports on direct, unambiguous, perception unmixed with rationalization would produce knowledge with certainty.
A mutawatir tradition is one which has been transmitted throughout the first three generations of Muslims by such a large number of narrators that the possibility of fabrication must be entirely discarded.
[T]he mutawatir hadith stands on the same footing as the Qur'an itself." 
According to the majority of Ulama, the authority of a mutawatir hadith is equivalent to that of the Qur'an. Universal continuous testimony (tawatur) engenders certainty (yaqin) and the knowledge that it creates is equivalent to knowledge that is acquired through sense-perception.
A great majority of Muslim legal theoreticians (usuuliyyun) espoused the view that the mutawatir yields necessary or immediate knowledge (daruri), whereas a minority thought that the information contained in such reports can be known through mediate or acquired knowledge (muktasab or nazari).

Orthodox hadith scholars (like Wael Hallaq and Ibn al-Salah) disagree, finding non-mutawatir hadith adequate. "According to the majority of the ulama of the four Sunni schools, acting upon ahad is obligatory even if ahad fails to engender positive knowledge. Thus, in practical legal matters, preferable zann [meaning, speculative] "is sufficient as a basis of obligation",  according to Mohammad Hashim Kamal. (However, in "matters of belief", the bar is higher and ahad hadith are not sufficient.) Ibn al-Salah (d. 643/1245), "one of the most distinguished traditionists of the muta'akhkhirun", argues (according to Farooq), that because mutawatir type hadith is rare, "for much of Islamic praxis, certainty of knowledge is neither feasible nor required. Rather, probable or reasonable knowledge is adequate" for determining the gamut of Islamic practices.

Applicable only to the first generation?
Another argument is that those verses of the Quran enjoining Muslims to obey/imitate Muhammad are directed at the Muhammad's contemporaries and not later generations.

A least one group of Muslims (the Quranist Ahle-Quran movement) argue that the verses were directed towards the particular circumstances of the companions of the Prophet, Muhammad's contemporaries, and not to generations thereafter. As circumstances change so must details of the law, while the basic unchangeable principles of Islam are found in the Quran. (In addition, while the Quran includes term sunnah several times, including in the phrase "sunnat Allah" (way of God), it never talks about "sunnat al-nabi" (way of the prophet)—the phrase customarily used by proponents of hadith—or "sunnah" in connection with Muhammad or other prophets.)

Later Quranists expanded on this. Early twentieth century scholar, Muhammad Tawfiq Sidqi (d. 1920) of Egypt argued that  "even mutawatir connection" of a hadith was not enough to "prove that a practice is binding in every age and every place". Sidqi called the hadith-based sunnah of Muhammad "temporary and provisional law", and offered several reasons why the sunnah was "intended only for those who lived during the Prophet's era":
that the sunnah "was not written" down for safe keeping "during the time of the Prophet";
the companions of Muhammad "made no arrangement for the preservation of the Sunnah "whether in a book or in their memories";
hadith were not transmitted from one generation to the next verbatim;
the sunnah was "not committed to memory" like the Quran so that "differences developed among different transmitters";
if the sunnah "had been meant for all people" this would not have happened and it "would have been carefully preserved and circulated as widely as possible";
much of the sunnah obviously only applies to "Arabs of Muhammad's time and is based on local customs and circumstances".

Obedience/imitation in modern times
In a high court decision in 20th century Pakistan, justice Muhammad Shafiʿi argued against the doctrine that the words and actions of the Prophet are divine revelation, and that (at least in the contemporary era) Quranic demands for obedience to Muhammad are actually demands for us to
be as honest, as steadfast, as earnest and as religious and pious as he was and not that we should act and think exactly as he did because that is unnatural and humanly impossible and if we attempted to do that, life will become absolutely difficult.

Sunnah from practice not hadith
Some critics (Fazlur Rahman Malik, Javed Ahmad Ghamidi) have attempted to working around the problem of hadith authenticity by establishing "a basis for sunnah independent of hadith".
Some of the most basic and important features of the sunnah—the five pillars of salat (ritual prayer) and zakat (alms), etc.—were  known to Muslims from being passed down 'from the many to the many' (according to scholars of fiqh such as Al-Shafi'i) i.e. by Mutawatir practice  bypassing books of hadith. (Muhammad Tawfiq Sidqi and Rashid Rida also strongly embraced the five pillars of salat, zakat, sawm, etc. while questing the importance of hadith.) Fazlur Rahman Malik argued sunnah should be "a general umbrella concept" but not one "filled with absolutely specific content" of hadith. Though hadith and isnad (chain of transmitters) had been tampered with and could not be held at the level of vertatim divine revelation, nonetheless they should not be discarded because they passed on the "spirit" of Prophet and should be given high regard as ijma (consensus or agreement of the Muslim scholars—which is another classical source of Islamic law).

Applicable only to the Quran? 
Associated with the argument that verses of the Quran enjoining Muslims to obey and imitate Muhammad apply only to contemporaries of The Prophet, is the idea that for modern Muslims, not only is hadith unnecessary, so is (much) of its basis, the Sunnah. Obedience to the Prophet is contained in obeying the Qur'an, the book that God sent down to Muhammad; that the Quran was an explanation of everything. When Muslims read verse Q.3:81—"Now that We have given you a share of the Book and Wisdom, ...", the common interpretation that "the Book" is the Quran and "Wisdom" is hadith is incorrect—"Wisdom" refers to "the specific rulings of the Book".  Quranic verses sometimes sited in support of the idea of "Quranism", that the Quran is clear and complete as it is, and hadith are not needed, are:
   which say the Quran is "detailed" or "fully explained"; 
 "complete", "perfect", or "fulfilled";
 "detailed explanation of all things";
 which says that "we have not neglected in the book a thing"

This idea goes back to the Ahl al-Kalam movement of the second Islamic century which rejected the Hadith on theological grounds (as well as  questioning its authenticity) and was embraced by Muhammad Tawfiq Sidqi, who wrote, "If anything other than the Qur'an had been necessary for religion ... the Prophet would have commanded its registration in writing, and God would have guaranteed its preservation."

A different version of this idea is that all hadith "at variance with the Quran should be discarded, irrespective of their chain of transmission." The Quran "overruled" hadith.

Western scholarship 
Western scholars have had some of the same "specific concerns" about hadith as Muslim Islamic scholars, but have "only occasionally" had any "direct impact" on debates by Muslims over the issues.

Between 1890 and 1950 the era of "Orientalist" studies of hadith began with Ignác Goldziher  (1850–1921) and Joseph Schacht (1902–1969) and their "two influential and founding works", (according to Mohammed Salem Al-Shehri).
Goldziher "inaugurated the critical study" of the hadith's authenticity and concluded that the "great majority of the Prophetic hadith constitute evidence not of the Prophet's time which they claim to belong, but rather of much later periods", according to Wael B. Hallaq. Schacht later refined Goldziher's critical study.

John Esposito notes that "Modern Western scholarship has seriously questioned the historicity and authenticity of the hadith", maintaining that "the bulk of traditions attributed to the Prophet Muhammad were actually written much later." According to Esposito, Schacht "found no evidence of legal traditions before 722", from which Schacht concluded that "the Sunna of the Prophet is not the words and deeds of the Prophet, but apocryphal material" dating from later.
According to Wael B. Hallaq, as of 1999 scholarly attitude in the West towards the authenticity of hadith has taken three approaches:

since Schacht published his monumental work in 1950, scholarly discourse on this matter (i.e., the issue of authenticity) has proliferated. Three camps of scholars may be identified: one attempting to reconfirm his conclusions, and at times going beyond them; another endeavoring to refute them and a third seeking to create a middle, perhaps synthesized, position between the two. Among others, John Wansbrough, and Michael Cook belong to the first camp, while Nabia Abbott, F. Sezgin, M. Azami, Gregor Schoeler and Johann Fück belong to the second. Motzki, D. Santillana, G.H. Juynboll, Fazlur Rahman and James Robson take the middle position.

Henry Preserved Smith and Ignác Goldziher also challenged the reliability of the hadith, Smith stating that "forgery or invention of traditions began very early" and "many traditions, even if well authenticated to external appearance, bear internal evidence of forgery." Goldziher writes that "European critics hold that only a very small part of the ḥadith can be regarded as an actual record of Islam during the time of Mohammed and his immediate followers." In his Mohammedan Studies, Goldziher states: "it is not surprising that, among the hotly debated controversial issues of Islam, whether political or doctrinal, there is not one in which the champions of the various views are unable to cite a number of traditions, all equipped with imposing isnads".

Also throwing doubt on the doctrine that common use of hadith of Muhammad goes back to the generations immediately following the death of the prophet is historian Robert G. Hoyland, who quotes acolytes of two of the earliest Islamic scholars: 
"I spent a year sitting with Abdullah ibn Umar (d.693, son of the second Caliph, who is said to be the second most prolific narrator of ahadith, with a total of 2,630 narrations) and I did not hear him transmit anything from the prophet";
"I never heard Jabir ibn Zayd (d. ca. 720) say 'the prophet said ...' and yet the young men round here are saying it twenty times an hour".

Historian Robert G. Hoyland, states during Umayyad times only the central government was allowed to make laws, religious scholars began to challenge this by claiming they had been transmitted hadith by the Prophet. Al-Sha'bi, a narrator of hadith, when hearing of this, criticizes people who just go around narrating many prophetic hadiths without care by saying he never heard from Umar I's son ‘Abdallah any hadith from the Prophet except just one. Hoyland vindicates Islamic sources as accurately representative of Islamic history. Gregor Schoeler, a German Orientalist writes: "He [Hoyland] shows that they [non-Islamic sources] are hardly suitable to support an alternative account of early Islamic history; on the contrary, they frequently agree with Islamic sources and supplement them."

Bernard Lewis writes that "the creation of new hadiths designed to serve some political purpose has continued even to our own time." In the buildup to the first Gulf War a "tradition" was published in the Palestinian daily newspaper Al-Nahar on December 15, 1990, "and described as `currently in wide circulation`" It "quotes the Prophet as predicting that "the Greeks and Franks will join with Egypt in the desert against a man named Sadim, and not one of them will return".

Isnads 
Reza Aslan quotes Schacht's maxim: `the more perfect the isnad, the later the tradition`, which he (Aslan) calls "whimsical but accurate".

According to G.H.A. Juynboll, "the institution of the isnad came into existence roughly three quarters of a century after the prophet's death" and before that hadith and "qisas (mostly legendary stories) were transmitted in a haphazard fashion if at all, and mostly anonymously. Since the isnad came into being, names of older authorities were supplied where the new isnad precepts required such. Often the names of well-known historical personalities were chosen but more often the names of fictitious persons were offered to fill the names in isnads which were as yet far from perfect. ..."

Patricia Crone agrees, noting that early traditionalists were still developing the practice of detailing chains of narration (isnads) of their hadith that by later standards were sketchy/deficient, even though these early scholars were closer to the historical material. Later hadith possessed impeccable isnad, but were more likely to be fabricated. She argues it is not possible to narrow down a "core" of authentic hadith because we do not know when the fabrication of them started.  
Bukhari [d.870] is said to have examined a total of 600,000 traditions attributed to the Prophet; he preserved some 7000 (including repetitions), or in other words dismissed some 593,000 as inauthentic. If Ibn Hanbal [d.855] examined a similar number of traditions, he must have rejected about 570,000, his collection containing some 30,000 (again including repetitions). Of Ibn Hanbal's traditions 1,710 (including repetitions) are transmitted by the companion Ibn Abbas [d.687]. Yet less than fifty years earlier one scholar had estimated that Ibn Abbas had only heard nine traditions from the Prophet, while another thought that the correct figure might be ten. If Ibn Abbas had heard ten traditions from the Prophet in the years around 800, but over a thousand by about 850 CE, how many had he heard in 700 or 632? Even if we accept that ten of Ibn Abbas' traditions are authentic, how do we identify them in the pool of 1,710?Ibn Rawandi, "Origins of Islam", 2000: p.119-120

Joseph Schacht states that the "whole technical criticism of traditions ... is mainly based on criticism of isnads", which he (and others) believe to be ineffective in eliminating fraudulent hadith. as they were subject to "growth, back-formation, and lateral spread" over decades.

Isnad and not Matn
If critics found fault with the traditionists examination of isnads, they were even less complimentary of their evaluation (or failure to) of matn—i.e. the substance of the hadith, what the Prophet did/said/approved of.

Critics argue that a serious weakness of the study of hadith by classical Muslim scholars was that the gist/matn of the hadith could not be examined for "making sense, being logical", as the matn were considered "the substance of divine revelation and therefore not susceptible of any form of legal or historical criticism". N.L. Coulson "points out that, although the Muslim scholars were aware of the possibility of Hadith forgeries, their test for authenticity was confined to a careful examination of the chain of transmitters who narrated the report.  'Provided the chain was uninterrupted and its individual links deemed trustworthy persons, the Hadith was accepted as binding law. There could, by the terms of the religious faith itself, be no questioning of the content of the report: for this was the substance of divine revelation and therefore not susceptible of any form of legal or historical criticism.

Schacht quotes Shafi'i asserting that hadith from the Prophet have to be accepted without questioning and reasoning: `If a tradition is authenticated as coming from the Prophet, we have to resign ourselves to it, and your talk and the talk of others about why and how, is a mistake ..."

Goldziher also casts aspersions on isnads, saying, "judgement of the value of the contents depends on the judgement of the correctness of the isnad. ... Muslim critics have no feeling for even the crudest anachronisms provide that the isnad is correct ... Traditions are only investigated in respect of their outward form".

European and non-Muslim scholars deemed this traditional type of critique inadequate. The Hadith was to be tested by its content and by the place its terms occupied in the development of legal though and institutions ...'"

Biographical evaluation
Another criticism of isnads was of the efficacy of the traditional Hadith studies field known as biographical evaluations (ʿilm al-rijāl)—evaluating the moral and mental capacity of transmitters/narrators. John Wansbrough argues that the isnads are should not be accepted, because of their "internal contradiction, anonymity, and arbitrary nature": specifically the lack of any information about many of the transmitters of the hadith  other than found in these biographical evaluations, thus putting into question whether they are "pseudohistorical projections", i.e. names made up by later transmitters.

References

Notes

Citations

Bibliography

 

 

Hadith
Hadith
Quranism